Nimblefoot was an Australian bred Thoroughbred racehorse that won the 1870 Melbourne Cup.

Nimblefoot's owner, Walter Craig, dreamt four months before the race that his horse won the Cup but noted the jockey wore a black armband. Craig's prediction came true. His horse won the Cup and the jockey, John Day, wore the armband in Craig's honour, as Craig had died of gout and pneumonia at the age of 45 on 16th Aug 1870, 3 months before the running of the race.

Johnny Day, the jockey, was a notable person in his own right. As a child, he had been a leading figure in the sport of pedestrianism and travelled to England to compete against leading pedestrian athletes of the day before returning to Australia and becoming a speed walking performer in the theatre, although it was said that his backers did not receive the profits they expected from supporting him. After a dispute resulting from Day's abscondment from the trainer William Lang soon after the 1870 Melbourne Cup, Day was required to return to his apprenticeship and continued to ride horses until at least 1877 when he suffered a bad fall in a ride in Yarrawonga. He died in 1885 in Inglewood of Addison's disease.

References

Melbourne Cup winners
1863 racehorse births
Racehorses bred in Australia
Racehorses trained in Australia